The Gypsy Gyppo String Band was an American an old-time music band, based in Seattle, Washington.

Active in the 1970s, it brought a contemporary sensibility to this music, treating it "as source material rather than holy writ." The band played a key role in reviving this music, bringing it out to the dying milieu of Grange halls and the somewhat-staid milieu of organized Modern western square dance to a hip, young urban audience. It laid the foundation of a square dance and contra dance scene in and around Seattle that continues to this day.

Members

 Warren Argo, banjo
 Jack Link, fiddle
 Armin Barnett, fiddle
 Bob Naess, fiddle
 Sandy Bradley, guitar
 Jerry Mitchell, mandolin

Notes

Further reading
 Argo, Warren (May 2002). "So What Is It About This Contra Dancing Anyway?" (PDF format; required Adobe Reader). Victory Music Review.

American folk musical groups
Musical groups disestablished in the 1970s
Musical groups established in the 1970s
Musical groups from Seattle
Old-time bands